The Tru Story: Continued is the third compilation album by rapper C-Murder. It was released on September 5, 2006 through Koch Records and featured production from former labelmates, Fiend, KLC and Carlos Stephens. The album was a continuation of his previous album, The Truest Shit I Ever Said, and has thus far been his lowest charting album, reaching No. 35 on the Billboard Top R&B/Hip-Hop Albums chart and No. 24 on the Independent Albums chart. This album sold nearly 4680 copies in its first week of release..

Track listing
"I Want It" (featuring Lil' Fame of M.O.P.) — 2:59                   
"I Live in the Ghetto" — 4:23
"Calliope" — 3:47
"On My Block" (featuring Bootleg) — 3:44
"I'm That Villain" — 3:57
"Die for Mine" (featuring B.G.) — 4:27
"Intro" — 1:52
"My Life" — 3:50
"Skit" — 0:19
"Stressin'" — 3:21
"Won't Let Me Out" (featuring Akon) — 4:00
"Hustla's Wife" (featuring Junie Bezel) — 3:24
"Holla @ Me" (featuring Soulja Slim) — 4:18
"Skit" — 0:14
"Y'all Heard of Me" (featuring B.G.) — 4:43
"Betta Watch Me" (featuring Fiend & Popeye) — 4:24
"Did U Hold It Down" (featuring Bass Heavy) — 4:36
"I Heard U Was Lookin 4 Me" (featuring Montez & Capone) — 4:19
"Back Up" — 4:04
"Camouflage & Murder" (featuring Mac & Curren$y) — 2:34
"Started Small Time" — 3:05
"Mama How You Figure" (featuring Ms. Peaches) — 3:27
"Outro" — 0:45

Charts

References

C-Murder albums
2006 albums
E1 Music albums
Sequel albums